Bluff Point is a northern coastal suburb of Geraldton, Western Australia. Its local government area is the City of Greater Geraldton.

The suburb was gazetted in 1972.

Geography

Demographics

Bluff Point residents had a median age of 46, well above the Geraldton median of 35, and 25.4% of residents were aged 65 or over. The median individual income was above average for the region — $523 per week compared with $461 per week. The population of Bluff Point was predominantly Australian-born - 80.7% as at the 2006 census - while 5.61% were born in the United Kingdom. 3.78% reported one or more parents of Italian birth. In the 2006 census, 2.81% of residents identified as Indigenous Australians.

The most common religious affiliations in descending order in the 2001 census were Roman Catholic, Anglican, no religion and Uniting.

Facilities
Bluff Point contains a recreation ground, community shopping centre, [primary school], a CWA and several retirement homes. Geraldton Camp School and St Lawrence's School are located within the suburb.

References

Suburbs of Geraldton